Tori Dunlap is an American investor, feminist, entrepreneur, and social media personality. She is the founder of 'Her First $100K', which is a financial education company.

Early life and education 
Dunlap is from Tacoma, Washington.  earned two undergraduate degrees, a Bachelors of Science in organizational communication and Bachelors in Theatre from University of Portland in 2016.

Career 
After graduating from college, Dunlap began an entry-level job as a digital marketing manager in Seattle. At the age of 22, she started a financial education blog and began saving money towards a goal of amassing $100,000 by the age of 25. She reached that goal in 2019. Dunlap founded Her First $100K, a multi-million dollar financial education company. Through the company, she provides financial education geared towards women. Her company expanded to twelve team members. The New York Times reported that Dunlap's business grossed more than $3.4 million in 2021.

Dunlap invests in index funds. She also generates revenue through speaking engagements, social media, and financial coaching. She joined TikTok in March 2020 but did not post financial videos until July 2020. Dunlap has 660,000 followers on Instagram and 2.2 million followers on TikTok .

Dunlap is an advocate for financial feminism. In May 2021, Dunlap released Financial Feminist. At its highest charting, it was the #1 Business Podcast on both Apple and Spotify, and #16 of all podcasts on Apple. It has received over 9 million downloads, and continues to be one of the top businesses podcasts in the United States.  She is a 2023 “Forbes 30 Under 30” honoree, in the “media” category.

Dunlap's first book from Harper Collins, Financial Feminist, was an instant New York Times bestseller, selling almost 20,000 copies in its first week.

Personal life 
Dunlap currently resides in Seattle.

References 

Living people
Year of birth missing (living people)
Place of birth missing (living people)
Businesspeople from Tacoma, Washington
University of Portland alumni
21st-century American businesswomen
21st-century American businesspeople
American feminists
American investors
American women investors
Businesspeople from Seattle
American women podcasters
American podcasters
Activists from Seattle
American TikTokers